David King (born 1993) is an Irish hurler who plays as a midfielder for the Offaly senior team.

Honours
Coolderry
Leinster Senior Club Hurling Championship: 2011
Offaly Senior Hurling Championship: 2010, 2011, 2015

Offaly
Christy Ring Cup: 2021

References

1993 births
Living people
Coolderry hurlers
Offaly inter-county hurlers